Zličín is a district and cadastral area in the west of Prague, located in an administrative district of the same name, which is part of Prague 5 in the old system and governs the cadastral areas Zličín, Sobín and the northern part of Třebonice. The name is best known among Praguers as the site for a large bus station, Metro terminus and depot and a number of shopping centres and hypermarkets, all of which are named after Zličín, despite belonging to the neighbouring district Třebonice.

Neighbouring districts

Districts of Prague